Orange Hill is a rural locality in the Maranoa Region, Queensland, Australia.

Geography
Bungil Creek forms the eastern boundary of the locality. The Carnarvon Highway passes through the locality from south to north. The predominant land use is for cattle grazing.

History 
The locality was named and bounded on 20 July 2001.

Education 
There are no schools in Orange Hill but Roma immediately to the south has both primary and secondary schools.

References 

Maranoa Region
Localities in Queensland